Imperial Productions is a manufacturer of toy soldiers in Greytown, New Zealand. Operating since 1982, it produces 54 mm cast lead figurines which are painted by hand. The miniatures depict mostly soldiers from the British Army in Napoleonic times through to World War II, as well as Māori and Victorian civilians.

Origin 

Imperial Productions was founded by David Cowe in 1982. Born in Lower Hutt, Cowe was the youngest of three boys, and received their hand-me-down pre-WWII lead toy soldiers to play with which sparked an interest in model making and military history. He later completed a diploma in graphic design and moved to London in the 1960s to attend Saint Martin's School of Art. On his return to New Zealand, he worked as a freelance illustrator and started a graphic design business as well as teaching at the Wellington School of Design. While living in Greytown with his family of three daughters, he noticed toy soldiers advertised in a UK magazine and decided to try making his own.

Cowe began casting soldiers commercially in 1982. In 1987 he opened a shop and showroom in a tiny building on McMaster Street, just off Greytown's main street, which was originally the Greytown bootmaker's shop. Sales were initially by telephone and mail, but are now largely online and international.

The soldiers 

Imperial Productions soldiers are cast in solid lead at 54 mm (2.25 inches) or 1:32 scale, the traditional "normal size" for the toy soldiers first used by W. Britain and European manufacturers in the 19th century. Masters are sculpted in resin, then a silicone rubber mould is created. A 70% lead, 30% tin alloy is melted at 300℃ and cast in the mould, and the resulting figure is used to make a rubber mould for mass production. The company produced more than 1000 hand-cast and hand-painted figurines a year; since 1998 Cowe's daughter Lisa Cowe-Kirk has painted the soldiers in traditional gloss enamel colours.

The soldiers generally range from Napoleonic to World War II, and include British military forces such as the 1st Foot Guards, Coldstream Guards from the Crimean War, and Camel Corps, dervishes, and Winston Churchill from the 1898 Battle of Omdurman. New Zealand figurines include Māori in traditional dress, the New Zealand Girls' Khaki Brigade, and Armed Constabulary from 1870. There are also Victorian civilian figurines including women, children, and domestic animals.

References

External links 

 Imperial Productions website

New Zealand companies established in 1982
Toy soldier manufacturing companies